Aycha Sawa is an American politician serving as the elected Comptroller of the city of Milwaukee. She is the first woman to serve in this position. She is also a CPA and a Certified Internal Auditor.

Early life and education 
Born Aycha Sirvanci, Sawa is a first-generation American. Her parents were both born and raised in Turkey. Sawa's father was a statistics professor at the University of Wisconsin, and her mother was an accountant and auditor.

While growing up, Sawa was active in the Turkish community. She was a Turkish dance performer at the Holiday Folk Fair, an annual festival in the Milwaukee area. During college, she was in the Turkish Student group. She attended UW-Madison, majoring in accounting. She received a Bachelor of Business Administration in 2006.

Sawa speaks fluent Turkish.

Career 
After college, Sawa worked for the Wisconsin Department of Transportation as a Journey Auditor. She was later employed at Baker Tilly as an accountant.

Sawa began her career at the City of Milwaukee Comptroller's Office in July, 2010. She started as an Auditor, and moved up the ranks to Deputy Comptroller in February 2017.

Sawa ran for Milwaukee Comptroller in the 2020 spring elections. She came in second place in the primary, earning 30.4% of the vote. She faced Jason Fields in the general election. Fields attempted to make an issue of Sawa's handling of an audit of lead piping. Politifact rated the claims "false" and "ridiculous". Sawa went on to win the general election with 50.4% of the vote.

Personal life 
According to her campaign website, Sawa is married to Drew Sawa. The pair live in Milwaukee's Downer Woods neighborhood. They have a daughter named Mina.

References 

21st-century American women politicians
Women in Wisconsin politics
Living people
American people of Turkish descent
University of Wisconsin–Madison alumni
People from Milwaukee
Year of birth missing (living people)
21st-century American politicians